UMHS may refer to:
 Union Mine High School, El Dorado, California, United States
 University of Medicine and Health Sciences, a for-profit medical school in Basseterre, Saint Christopher Island
 University of Michigan Health System, the academic medical center of the University of Michigan in Ann Arbor, Michigan, United States
 Upper Moreland High School, Willow Grove, Pennsylvania, United States
 Upper Merion Area High School, King of Prussia, Pennsylvania, United States